Musical Chairs is the third studio album by American rock vocalist Sammy Hagar, released in October 1977 by Capitol Records. The lineup features three quarters of the classic Montrose lineup, sans Ronnie Montrose (and the only full album by Sammy Hagar to do so; 1997's Marching to Mars also includes the song "Leaving the Warmth of the Womb", played by the four original Montrose members).

Song information
"Try (Try to Fall in Love)" was originally released as a single by its writer's stage moniker of Cooker.

Track listing

 The 1996 One Way Records re-release of the album includes this bonus track, which Hagar released as a single in 1979 and did not appear on CD until The Best of Sammy Hagar compilation album in 1992.

Personnel
Sammy Hagar – lead vocals, guitar
Denny Carmassi – drums
Bill Church – bass guitar
Alan Fitzgerald – keyboards
Gary Pihl – guitar

Production
John Carter – producer
Warren Dewey – engineer
Paul Grupp – additional recording
Andrew Powell – string arrangement
Hipgnosis – package design

Singles
"You Make Me Crazy" b/w "Reckless" (Capitol US 4502)
"You Make Me Crazy" b/w "Hey Boys" (Capitol Spain 006-085.367)
"You Make Me Crazy" b/w "Reckless" (Capitol Holland 5C 006-85350)
"Turn Up the Music" b/w "Hey Boys" (Capitol 4550)

Releases
 Capitol (US) SN-16051 
 Capitol (UK) GO 2021 
 Capitol (US) CDP 7 48434 2 
 BGO Records (1994 UK reissue) BGOCD201 
 One Way Records (1996 US Reissue) 72438 19091 26 
 Capitol (1996 Japan reissue) TOCP-8343

External links
 Lyrics from Hagar's official web site

Sammy Hagar albums
1977 albums
Albums with cover art by Hipgnosis
Capitol Records albums